Netherwood is a New Jersey Transit railroad station on the Raritan Valley Line, in Plainfield, Union County, New Jersey, United States. It is located along North Avenue at the intersection of Netherwood Avenue and along South Avenue at the intersection of Belvedere Avenue. The station has a ticket vending machine, and the station house itself is located off of South Avenue.

History
Netherwood station was originally built by the Central Railroad of New Jersey in 1894. As with the rest of the CNJ, the station was subsidized by the New Jersey Department of Transportation in 1964 and absorbed into Conrail in 1976. The station is one of the two surviving CNJ stations in Plainfield (the other being Downtown Plainfield station), whereas the community previously had five; the other three being at Grant Avenue, Clinton Avenue (formerly known as Evona). The station building has been listed in the state and federal registers of historic places since 1984 and is part of the Operating Passenger Railroad Stations Thematic Resource, along with the other active station downtown.

Station layout
The station has two low-level side platforms.

See also
National Register of Historic Places listings in Union County, New Jersey
List of New Jersey Transit stations

References

External links

 Station House from Google Maps Street View
Raritan Valley Line (Unofficial NJTransit Homepage)

NJ Transit Rail Operations stations
Plainfield, New Jersey
Railway stations in Union County, New Jersey
Former Central Railroad of New Jersey stations
Railway stations on the National Register of Historic Places in New Jersey
Queen Anne architecture in New Jersey
Romanesque Revival architecture in New Jersey
Railway stations in the United States opened in 1894
National Register of Historic Places in Union County, New Jersey